Dorsum Owen is a wrinkle ridge at  in Mare Serenitatis on the Moon. It is 33 km long and was named after British geologist George Owen of Henllys in 1976.

References

External links
LAC-42
Dorsum Owen at The Moon Wiki

Ridges on the Moon
Mare Serenitatis